The American Buffalo, also known as a gold buffalo, is a 24-karat bullion coin first offered for sale by the United States Mint in 2006. The coin follows the design of the Indian Head nickel and has gained its nickname from the American Bison on the reverse side of the design. This was the first time the United States Government minted pure (.9999) 24-karat gold coins for the public. The coin contains one-troy ounce (31.1g) of pure gold and has a legal tender (face) value of US$50. Due to a combination of the coin's popularity and the increase in the price of gold the coin's value has increased considerably. The initial 2006 U.S. Mint price of the proof coin was $800. In 2007 the price was $899.95, $1,410 in 2009, and $2,010 in 2011.

In addition to requiring a presidential dollar coin series to begin in 2007 and redesigning the cent in 2009, the Presidential $1 Coin Act of 2005 mandated the production of a one-ounce 24-karat gold bullion coin with a face value of $50 and a mintage limit of up to 300,000 coins.

Design
The design of the American Buffalo gold bullion coin is a modified version of James Earle Fraser's design for the Indian Head nickel (Type 1), issued in early 1913. After a raised mound of dirt below the animal on the reverse was reduced, the Type 2 variation continued to be minted for the rest of 1913 and every year until 1938, except for 1922, 1932, and 1933 when no nickels were struck. Generally, Fraser's Indian Head nickel design is regarded as among the best designs of any U.S. coins.  The same design also was used on the 2001 Smithsonian commemorative coin.

The obverse (front) of the coin depicts a Native American, whom Fraser said he created as a mixture of the features of three chiefs from different American Indian tribes, Big Tree, Iron Tail, and Two Moons, who posed as models for him to sketch. The obverse also shows the motto "LIBERTY" on the top right, the year of mintage on the bottom left, and below that the letter F for Fraser.

The American Buffalo gold bullion coin further has in common with the nickel the motto E PLURIBUS UNUM above the buffalo's lower back and the device UNITED·STATES·OF·AMERICA along the top.
Differences that can be noted between the nickel and the fifty dollar piece are, on the gold American Buffalo coin the mound area of the reverse of the Indian Head nickel bearing the words, FIVE CENTS, has been changed to read $50 1 OZ. .9999 FINE GOLD. Also, the motto, IN GOD WE TRUST, appearing on all U.S. gold coins since 1908, can be seen on the reverse of the newer coin to the left of, and beneath, the buffalo's head.

Fractional sizes
The U.S. Mint indicated an expansion of the program, to include buffalo gold coins in fractional sizes for 2008 only. The specially-packaged 8–8-08 Double Prosperity set contained a one-half ounce gold buffalo coin.

Weights and measures provided below:

Distribution
Currently, all U.S. bullion coins, including the American Buffalo gold piece, are being struck at the West Point Mint in New York. According to the U.S. Mint website, only the proof version of the buffalo gold coin bears the mint mark "W" on the obverse (front) of the coin, behind the neck of the Indian; the bullion version does not have the "W" mint mark. The 2006 and 2007 coins only have been issued in a one-ounce version, but in 2008, $5, $10, and $25 face value coins were minted with 1/10 oz, 1/4 oz, and 1/2 oz of gold respectively.

After a long wait by both collectors and investors, the uncirculated version of the American Buffalo gold piece was made available to coin dealers on June 20, 2006. Collectors who wanted to purchase the proof version from the mint were given the opportunity to place their orders with the mint beginning on July 22. The 2006 proof quality coin has a strict mintage limit of 300,000, with an additional enforced limit of only ten (10) coins per household. The catalog number of the 2006 proof coin at the U.S. Mint is (BA6).

The coin was created in order to compete with foreign 24-karat gold bullion coins. Since investors sometimes prefer 99.99% pure gold over the 91.67% gold used in the American Gold Eagle, many were choosing non-U.S. coins, such as the Canadian Gold Maple Leaf, to meet their bullion needs. With the American Buffalo coin, the U.S. government hopes to increase the amount of U.S. gold sales and cash in on the 24-karat sales, which makes up about 60% of the world gold market.

On September 26, 2008, the U.S. Mint announced that, temporarily, it would halt sales of the American Buffalo coins because it could not keep up with soaring demand as investors sought the safety of gold amid the subprime mortgage crisis of the late 2000s, which had also affected the price of gold.

Mintage

Bullion Mintage for the bullion version of the American Buffalo is as follows (all 1 ounce coins):

Proof Mintage for the proof version of the American Buffalo is as follows (all 1 ounce coins):

Reverse Proof Mintage for the reverse proof version of the American Buffalo is as follows (all 1 ounce coins):

See also

American Eagle bullion coins
American Buffalo (play), in which three criminals conspire to steal a valuable Indian Head nickel American coin
Bullion
Inflation hedge

==References==

External links
U.S. Mint Program Page
American Buffalo Coin page at U.S. Mint Catalog
American Buffalo Gold Bullion Coin, with Specifications

Currencies introduced in 2006
United States gold coins
Bison on coins
Native Americans on coins
Works by James Earle Fraser (sculptor)
Bullion coins of the United States
Gold bullion coins